"The End" is an epic song by the American rock band the Doors. Lead singer Jim Morrison initially wrote the lyrics about his break up with an old girlfriend Mary Werbelow, but it evolved through months of performances at the Whisky a Go Go into a much longer song. The Doors recorded a nearly 12-minute version for their self-titled debut album, which was released on January 4, 1967.

"The End" was ranked at number 336 on 2010 Rolling Stone magazines list of The 500 Greatest Songs of All Time. The song's guitar solo was ranked number 93 on Guitar Worlds "100 Greatest Guitar Solos of All Time".

Lyrics and recording
In a 1969 interview with Jerry Hopkins, Morrison said about the lyrics:

When interviewed by Lizze James, he pointed out the meaning of the verse "My only friend, the End":

Shortly past the midpoint of the nearly 12-minute-long album version, the song enters a spoken word section with the words, "The killer awoke before dawn / he put his boots on". That section of the song reaches a dramatic climax with the lines, "Father / Yes son? / I want to kill you / Mother, I want to..." (with the next words screamed out unintelligibly). Morrison had worked on a student production of Oedipus Rex at Florida State University. Ray Manzarek, the former keyboard player of the Doors, explained:

When asked if whether the lyrics of the Oedipal section resonated with his own parents, Morrison simply replied, "I don't want to talk about it. I don't want to involve anyone unless they want it." On the other hand, Doors' guitarist Robby Krieger believed that Morrison indeed suffered "from an apparent Oedipus complex". However, in John Densmore's autobiography Riders on the Storm, he recalls when Morrison explained the actual meaning of the song:

According to Mojo magazine, during the recording sessions, Morrison was obsessed and skeptical of the words, "Fuck the mother, kill the father", as Krieger recalled, "He was on this Oedipus complex trip." Then he accidentally threw a TV, which was brought in by sound engineer Bruce Botnick, at the control room window. After the incident, he was sent home by producer Paul A. Rothchild. However, Morrison, who had taken LSD, returned in the middle of the night, broke into the studio and hosed it with a fire extinguisher. The agent marked only the instruments that were mounted in the recording place. Rothchild came back and advised the studio owner to charge the damage to Elektra.

The genesis and the use of the word "fuck" is described by Michael Hicks as follows:

The Pop Chronicles documentary reports that critics found the song "Sophoclean and Joycean."

"The End" was recorded live in the studio with no overdubbing. Two takes were recorded, with reportedly the second being used for the album.  It was one of the last songs performed by the original group at their last concert on December 12, 1970, at The Warehouse in New Orleans.

Musical style
"The End" has been characterized as a precursor of the gothic rock genre. In a live review published in The Williams Record in October 1967, critic John Stickney described the Doors collation as "gothic rock", which was one of the first uses of the term in print; most notably, he was more pensive for their contribution to "The End", citing Morrison's vocal performance in particular as "male-violent, satanic, electric and on fire". In 2017, Pitchfork included it on their list of "The Story of Goth in 33 Songs". In his column, Rusty Pipes indicated the track to be as one of the early examples of art rock music.

"The End" is performed into the pitches of the Mixolydian mode in the key of D, and incorporates aspects from Indian music. Krieger used an open guitar tuning, which he had learned from Ravi Shankar's music lessons at the Kinnara School of Music in Los Angeles, to create a sitar or veena sound; this enhances the raga rock mood. Author Peter Lavezzoli featured "The End" in his book, The Dawn of Indian Music; stating that Krieger also developed with his tuning an "Indian jhala style" and "rapid strumming alternating with the melody line" in his guitar playing. Scholars Aaron Barlow and Martin Kich distinguished in their book Pop Goes the Decade: The Sixties, that the song has influenced most of the acid rock genre. "The End" has also been classified as a psychedelic rock and hard rock piece.

Other versions

Studio
While the 1967 release of the song is the best-known version, there are other, slightly different versions available.

A significantly shorter edit, sometimes erroneously referred to as a "single version", was released on the CD version of the Greatest Hits album. The edited version is almost half the length of the original.
The version used in Francis Ford Coppola's film Apocalypse Now is different from the 1967 release, being a remix specifically made for the movie. The remixed version emphasizes the vocal track at the final crescendo, highlighting Morrison's liberal use of scat and expletives. The vocal track can partly be heard in the 1967 release, although the expletives are effectively buried in the mix (and the scat-singing only faintly audible), and Morrison can only be heard clearly at the end of the crescendo with his repeated line of "Kill! Kill!". This version originated with the original master copy from Elektra's tape vaults; when Walter Murch, the Sound Designer, requested copies of the song from Elektra Records for use in the film, the studio unknowingly sent him the original master tracks to use, which explains the different sonic quality of the song used in the film.
A new 5.1 mix was issued with the 2006 box set Perception. The new 5.1 mix has more sonic details than the original 1967 mix.
While it is officially recognized that the 1967 version is an edit consisting of two different takes recorded on two straight days—the splice being right before the line "The killer awoke before dawn", and easily pinpointed by cut cymbals—the full takes, or the edited parts, have yet to surface.
In the version recorded live in Madison Square Garden, the lyric "Mother, I want to fuck you" can be heard clearly, instead of the unintelligible screaming of the studio version.

Live
 March 1967 (13:54), released on Live at the Matrix
 July 5, 1968, Hollywood Bowl (15:42), released on In Concert
 January 17, 1970, New York City, Show 2 (17:46), released on Live in New York
 May 8, 1970, Cobo Arena, Detroit (17:35), released on Live in Detroit
 June 6, 1970, Pacific Coliseum, Vancouver, Canada (17:58), released on Live in Vancouver 1970

Marilyn Manson cover

Marilyn Manson recorded a cover of "The End" for use on the soundtrack to the miniseries The Stand. The recording was produced by country musician Shooter Jennings, who also produced Manson's eleventh studio album, We Are Chaos. The song was released for digital download and streaming on November 22, 2019, with a 7-inch picture disc scheduled to be released via Loma Vista Recordings on March 6, 2020. The vinyl would have been limited to 2,000 copies worldwide, and all pre-orders were accompanied by an immediate download of the track. The vinyl artwork consisted of an original watercolor piece painted by the vocalist. A music video based on the single's artwork was created by Zev Deans, which utilized watercolor self-portraits created by Manson.

The 7" vinyl release was canceled, however, and the song and its music video were removed from all download, streaming and video hosting services shortly after release. An interviewer with Guitar World later said the vinyl release was "nixed" by the Doors, with Jennings saying the band claimed the pair were "taking liberties" with its release. The Stand director Josh Boone also confirmed the cover would not appear in the miniseries, saying the recording "ultimately proved too expensive to use. The show was made on a very tight budget and some of the dreams we had went to the wayside."

Manson had previously released a version of the Doors song "Five to One" as a b-side on their 2000 single "Disposable Teens". He later performed "Five to One" – as well as "Love Me Two Times" and "People Are Strange" – alongside Ray Manzarek and Robby Krieger at the 2012 Sunset Strip Music Festival. In 2016, he performed "Not to Touch the Earth" with guitarist Johnny Depp during an event at Amoeba Music.

Charts

References

External links
 
 Usage in film and television: see "The Doors - Soundtrack. 'The End'" at IMDb
 Song lyrics at thedoors.com
 Accolades archived at Acclaimed Music

The Doors songs
Raga rock songs
Gothic rock songs
Songs written by John Densmore
Songs written by Robby Krieger
Songs written by Ray Manzarek
Songs written by Jim Morrison
1967 songs
Nico songs
Song recordings produced by Paul A. Rothchild
Songs about death
Marilyn Manson (band) songs
Loma Vista Recordings singles